Gorguja is a village in the Spanish exclave centred on the town of Llívia which is surrounded by France, north west of Puigcerda. Gorguja can only be reached from Spain by travelling through a short stretch of France.

References

Populated places in Cerdanya (comarca)